The 1927 Georgetown Blue and Gray football team represented Georgetown University during the 1927 college football season. Led by Lou Little in his fourth season as head coach, the team went 8–1.

Schedule

References

Georgetown
Georgetown Hoyas football seasons
Georgetown Blue and Gray football